The 2019 Rally de Portugal (also known as the Vodafone Rally de Portugal 2019) was a motor racing event for rally cars that was held over four days between 30 May and 2 June 2019. It marked the fifty-third running of Rally de Portugal, and was the seventh round of the 2019 World Rally Championship, World Rally Championship-2 and the newly-created WRC-2 Pro class. The rally was also part of the Portuguese national championship and Peugeot Rally Cup Ibérica. The 2019 event was based in Matosinhos in Porto and consisted of twenty special stages totalling  competitive kilometres.

Thierry Neuville and Nicolas Gilsoul were the defending rally winners. Their team, Hyundai Shell Mobis WRT, were the manufacturers' winners. Pontus Tidemand and Jonas Andersson were the defending winners in the World Rally Championship-2 category, but they did not participate in the rally. The Swedish crew Denis Rådström and Johan Johansson were the reigning World Rally Championship-3 winners, but they did not defend their titles as the category was discontinued in 2019.

Ott Tänak and Martin Järveoja won the Rally de Portugal for the first time in their career. Their team, Toyota Gazoo Racing WRT, were the manufacturers' winners. The Škoda Motorsport crew of Kalle Rovanperä and Jonne Halttunen took the back-to-back victory in the WRC-2 Pro category, finishing first in the combined WRC-2 category, while the French crew of Pierre-Louis Loubet and Vincent Landais won the wider WRC-2 class.

Background

Championship standings prior to the event
Defending world champions Sébastien Ogier and Julien Ingrassia led both the drivers' and co-drivers' championships with a ten-point lead over Ott Tänak and Martin Järveoja. Thierry Neuville and Nicolas Gilsoul were third, a further two points behind. In the World Rally Championship for Manufacturers, Hyundai Shell Mobis WRT held a twenty-nine-point lead over Toyota Gazoo Racing WRT.

In the World Rally Championship-2 Pro standings, Gus Greensmith and Elliott Edmondson held a five-point lead ahead of Mads Østberg and Torstein Eriksen in the drivers' and co-drivers' standings respectively. Łukasz Pieniążek and Kamil Heller were third, six points further back. In the manufacturers' championship, M-Sport Ford WRT led Škoda Motorsport by sixty-two points, with Citroën Total fifteen points further behind in third.

In the World Rally Championship-2 standings, Benito Guerra and Jaime Zapata led the drivers' and co-drivers' standings by fourteen points respectively. Takamoto Katsuta and Daniel Barritt were second, following by Ole Christian Veiby and Jonas Andersson in third.

Entry list
The following crews entered into the rally. The event opened to crews competing in the World Rally Championship, World Rally Championship-2, WRC-2 Pro, Portuguese national championship, Peugeot Rally Cup Ibérica and privateer entries not registered to score points in any championship. A total of sixty-one entries were received, with twelve crews entered with World Rally Cars and twenty-seven entered the World Rally Championship-2. Four crews were nominated to score points in the Pro class.

Route
The 2019 route cut  from the 2018 itinerary to meet the regulation of the  maximum total distance.

Itinerary

All dates and times are WEST (UTC+1).

Report

World Rally Cars
Hyundai Motorsport had initially planned to enter Andreas Mikkelsen for the rally but he was dropped in favour of Sébastien Loeb, due to Mikkelsen's inconsistent form on gravel. However, Loeb's rally was conceded almost sixteen  minutes as his fuel system failed. So was his teammate Dani Sordo, who grabbed an early lead until the similar issue happened to him. Following Hyundai's double disasters, Toyota managed to end the day with an 1-2-3. Teemu Suninen was the only driver can match Yaris' pace, but a brake failure pushed the Finn down to sixth. Teammate Elfyn Evans hit trouble as well. The Welshman lost almost four minutes when his Fiesta stopped with an electrical problem, which raised heavy dust when went back on the road. The dust affected greatly on Esapekka Lappi, who suffered a puncture early before, but the time he loss was later credited back to him.

On day two, rally leader Ott Tänak hit a damper issue and slashed his lead to just 4.3 seconds. Teammate Jari-Matti Latvala suffered the same problem, but he was unable to finish the rally, so Rally2 for the Finn. A double dose of tactics by Thierry Neuville's Hyundai team boosted him to third, less than ten seconds off the lead. Gus Greensmith had to retire from the day as he crashed his Fiesta into a ditch.

Eventually, Tänak secured a back-to-back victory, while the final day saw four major retirements. Esapekka Lappi was running fifth until he hit a bank and broke the rear left suspension. Kris Meeke spun out second place to his rival before he retired as he crashed into a tree. Gus Greensmith's WRC debut ended up with a crash in the final Fafe stage. Sébastien Loeb was another late casualty, retiring his i20 after hitting a bank in the same stage despite the fact that he had crossed the finishing line.

Classification

Special stages

Championship standings

World Rally Championship-2 Pro
Škoda Motorsport débuted a new-generation Fabia R5, the Škoda Fabia R5 Evo, driven by drivers Jan Kopecký and Kalle Rovanperä. Rovanperä led the category comfortably until a puncture lost his lead to Kopecký. Mads Østberg was unable to finish the leg as he suffered several issues including brake problems, damaged suspension and puncture. In leg two, Rovanperä recaptured the lead as the Škoda Fabia R5 Evo's bonnet of Kopecký broke free from its fastenings after a heavy landing from a jump. Lukasz Pieniazek crashed into a tree and forced to retire from the day. In the end, Rovanperä claimed the victory as well as moving up to the top of the class standings.

Classification

Special stages
Results in bold denote first in the RC2 class, the class which both the WRC-2 Pro and WRC-2 championships run to.

Championship standings

World Rally Championship-2
Ole Christian Veiby led Nikolay Gryazin by 25.2 seconds. Rhys Yates retired due to double punctures, while Jari Huttunen stopped with suspension damage. Local driver Pedro Meireles retired from the rally as his Polo R5 caught fire. Day two was full of dramas. Overnight leader Veiby's rally ended up with car on fire, which handled the lead to Takamoto Katsuta, who also retired from the day due to crashing. Other retirements included Jari Huttunen, who crashed his Hyundai i20 R5, and local driver Diogo Salvi. Eerik Pietarainen damaged his Fabia's suspension, which dropped him from second to fourth in the class standings. Following so many dramas, Pierre-Louis Loubet snatched the victory.

Classification

Special stages
Results in bold denote first in the RC2 class, the class which both the WRC-2 Pro and WRC-2 championships run to.

Championship standings

Notes

References

External links

  
 2019 Rally de Portugal in e-wrc website
 The official website of the World Rally Championship

Portugal
2019 in Portuguese motorsport
May 2019 sports events in Portugal
June 2019 sports events in Portugal
2019